Mickey Mouse in Color was a book published in 1988 by Another Rainbow Publishing, featuring the works of Disney comic artists Floyd Gottfredson and Carl Barks.

Overview
There were 3 editions:
 A Deluxe Limited Regular Edition of 3000 - signed by both Floyd Gottfredson and Carl Barks
 A Deluxe Limited Gold Plate Edition of 100 - signed by both Floyd Gottfredson and Carl Barks
 A Trade Edition

The Deluxe Regular editions were oversize, hardbound books measuring 12½” × 16½”, containing 248 pages (216 of which are in full color), with a Mylar dust jacket. There were 72 pages devoted to the Mickey Mouse Sunday page by Floyd Gottfredson and an additional 72 pages featuring Mickey Mouse daily strips by Floyd Gottfredson. In addition, there are two Mickey Mouse drawings of Carl Barks that he submitted to the Disney Studios in the mid-1930s. 

The book contains special articles and interviews with Gottfredson and Barks, including rare drawings, photographs, and published art. Finally, each book contains a numbered 7-inch record, which features a portion of Bruce Hamilton's interview with Floyd Gottfredson and Carl Barks in which the two creators reveal something very interesting about their favorite stories.

The Deluxe Gold Plate Edition, in addition to the above contents, also has an original Mickey Mouse sketch by Carl Barks. (Average size of sketch is
3" to 4" tall.)

The Trade Edition is a 9" × 11" hardback which features 8 comic strip adventures by Floyd Gottfredson. Also included are special features on Gottfredson and Mickey Mouse, featuring and interview with Gottfredson and an index of Mickey's complete comic strip adventures. These are not numbered or signed.

References 
 Mickey Mouse in Color at BruceHamilton.com

Disney comics titles
Mickey Mouse comics
1988 in comics